William Hatton (June 9, 1849 – October 22, 1894) was one of Carmel Valley, California's earliest pioneers. He was manager of the dairy and cattle interests of the Pacific Improvement Company, acquired land of his own, and became one of the wealthiest dairymen in Monterey County.

Early life 

William Hatton was born on June 9, 1849, in Aghowle, County Wicklow, Ireland. He was the fourth in a family of eight children. His father was Edward Hatton (1810-1890) and mother Ann Kelly (1815-1895). He left Ireland at age thirteen and went to sea as an apprentice sailor on board a merchant ship. He lived a seafaring life for seven years, achieve the title of first mate. At age 20, he settled in Charleston, South Carolina where he worked as an agent for the United States Revenue Cutter Service. This is where he met Katherine Harney (1851-1922) a native of James Island, South Carolina. Hatton and Kate came to Monterey County in 1870.

Hatton married Kate in 1875 in Monterey, California. They had nine children in 18 years, Anna M., Harriet H., Sarah J., Edward G., William H., Frank D., Howard I., Emily B, and Howard J. Their daughter, Anna Mary Hatton (1876-1939), married William E. Martin in 1903. William was the son of John Martin, which united two pioneering Carmel Valley families.

Professional life

Hatton took his first job as dairyman apprentice for E. St. John at the old St. John Dairy Ranch near Salinas, California. This job gave Hatton the funds to buy the  parcel of land from where he was working from the Pacific Improvement Company. He grew the dairy to 600 cows.

In 1888, the Pacific Improvement Company hired Hatton to manage two large Del Monte dairies, the Rancho Cañada de la Segunda in lower Carmel Valley and the ranching operations of Rancho Los Laureles in the upper Carmel Valley that the company purchased in 1882. The Del Monte Dairy became the sole supplier of cream, butter, and milk for the Hotel Del Monte. Hatton had the first telephone service in Carmel Valley, which was installed from Hotel Del Monte to his dairies.

In August 1889, Hatton, as Superintendent of PIC, purchased the  Joseph W. Gregg ranch southeast of the Carmel River mouth off Highway One, on what is now the Odello Ranch. The Odello Ranch got its name from Battista Odello (1885-1963) who came to American in 1909. His family worked the ranch until 1995. They sold the west side field to the State of California and the east side to actor Clint Eastwood in 1996.

Hatton Lower Dairy

Hatton managed the  Hatton Lower Dairy business at the Rancho Cañada location, which extended along the north bank of the Carmel River into the mouth of Carmel Valley. This is the site of the present-day The Barnyard Shopping Village and Palo Corona Regional Park. The land was once owned by Dominga Doni de Atherton, the widowed wife of Faxon Atherton (namesake of Atherton, California). In 1892, Hatton purchased the west half of the Rancho Cañada from Dominga for $55,000. The Hatton Lower Dairy had a large barn, cream separators, and wagons on the property. Hatton and his wife Kate built an eighteen room Victorian house, which was located at the entrance to the valley on land that is now Carmel Knolls. The house was completed in 1894, the year Hatton died. The Hatton neighbors included John Martin, Richard Snively, James Meadows, and Edward Berwick.

In 1921, the Hatton Fields was still being used for grazing cattle from the Hatton dairy. 

In 1925, Paul Flanders purchased  of property from the Hatton estate for $100,000. He founded the Carmel Land Company to help develop Hatton Fields. 

In July 1955, Frank Porter purchased the  parcel of the Hatton Ranch (once Rancho Cañada de la Segunda in Carmel Valley for $200,000. The land had been under lease to Kenneth Martin for cattle grazing. Porter subdivided  for homes and sold the remaining  as a ranch.

Phillip Hatton, grandson of William Hatton, was an applicant who submitted plans to the planning commission.

The name was shorted to Rancho Caňada a year later. 

In November 2015, Rancho Cañada decided not to renew its lease. In 2016, The Monterey Peninsula Regional Park District acquired  of the Rancho Caňada Country Club and golf course in Carmel Valley, that provides public access to the Palo Corona Regional Park. In a statement announcing the deal, Dryden Branson Bordin, representing the Hatton family, said, “This land has been in the family and contributing value to the community since the late 1800s. After receiving multiple offers on the property and much consideration, the family decided to sell the property to a group that could create an even greater public good.”

Hatton Middle Dairy

The Hatton Middle Dairy dates back to 1890, with the  tract that was deeded to Frank D. Hatton (1887-1943) in 1925, the son of William and Kate Hatton. The ranch was located on both sides of Carmel Valley Road about three miles east of Highway 1. Frank Hatton managed the ranch until his death in 1943.

The Hatton dairy barn, built ca. 1890, on the south side of Highway 1, was restored in 2011 by Frank Tarantino and is one of the only surviving structures from the Hatton’s dairy.

In 1966, Barbro Friden sold the ranch to Howard J. Morgens and his wife, who named it September Ranch at 676 Carmel Valley Road. The September Ranch includes a  equestrian facility.

In February 2018, the real estate investment fund, DLC Capital Partners, purchased the September Ranch. A press release announced that 90% of the  will be protected, including the barn, equestrian center, and hiking trail to Jack's Peak. The other 10% will be a residental subdivision.

Hatton Upper Dairy

In 1890, Hatton managed a second dairy up Carmel Valley called the Hatton Upper Dairy on the old Rancho Los Laureles. Guests from the Hotel Del Monte could visit the Los Laureles Lodge on the property to ride, hunt, and explore the trails. Hatton modernized the diary operations at the old Boronda adobe, adding Durham cattle to the Holsteins that increased the milk butterfat content. Large vats and presses were installed to manufacture Monterey Jack cheese. The Hatton's lived in a house built by Kinzea Klinkenbeard and raised their seven children there. 

The Del Monte Milk House dates to 1890 and still stands today in Carmel Valley Village, California just before the Robles del Rio Road, at the White Oak Plaza. A windowed tower at the building's top was designed to ventilate the milk inside. After the dairy closed, the Del Monte Milk House beame a residence and then in 1937, it became the Marion Meredith Inn. Marion married Philip Wilson, Jr. and by 1941, they renamed it the White Oak Inn. In 1949, Maarion made it into the Carmel Valley Art Gallery. It is now a wine tasting room.  

In 1926, Frank B. Porter bought  of the Rancho Los Laureles and launched the first residential subdivision in Carmel Valley that became Robles del Rio. In 1928, Sam C. Fertig of Pennsylvania, purchased part of Rancho El Del Monte (once Rancho Los Laureles) that included the Boronda adobe and the Los Laureles Lodge. In May 1946, Frank and his son Paul Porter bought the  farm from Muriel Vanderbilt Adams for an estimated $200,000. It was converted into the Rancho Del Monte subdivision and Rancho Del Monte Country Club (now Los Laureles Lodge).

In 1927, Marion Hollins, an athlete and a golf course developer, bought  in Carmel Valley. In 1936, Porter acquired  of the old Hollins ranch in Carmel Valley for $32,000. Porter sold a portion of the ranch to real estate developer Byington Ford for what is now the Carmel Valley Village and another became the C. E. Homan Ranch.

Death

Hatton died on October 22, 1894, in Carmel Valley, at the age of 45. He had returned to his ranch from Monterey and was caught up in a heavy shower when he caught cold. Newspapers said that the immediate cause of death was supposed to be a brain aneurysm. Further analysis determined it was bright's disease. He had an insurance policy for the sum of $25,000. He was a friend of the secretary of the Pacific Improvement Company, F. S. Douty who was also the administer of his estate. He was buried in Monterey, California. Every business in the city was closed from 12 pm until 3 pm out of respect for him. The funeral was from Masonic Hall under the sponsorship of the Watsonville Commandery No. 22, Knights Templar, and Monterey Lodge No. 217 F. & A. M. It was one of the largest funerals that took place in Monterey County.

Legacy

After his Hatton's death, his wife Kate and her brother John Harney managed the dairy until the 1900, when her sons took over the management with Andrew Stewart (stepson of John Martin). The Hatton land was left in equitable divisions among his heirs. Anna Martin was given the area known as the Martin Ranch (now Mission Ranch), Harriet, was given the area known as Rio Vista. Sarah was given the area known as Mission Fields. William, Jr. received the area now east of Rio Vista and bottom land, and Edward became owner of what was later called Hatton Fields. 

In the 1900s the Pacific Improvement Company liquidated their holdings (10,000 acres) and the Del Monte Properties headed by Samuel F.B. Morse, acquired the land. In 1923, they divided the land into 11 parcels for sale. The Hatton dairies were sold to various landowners. Today, the Carmel Valley Village, the Holman Ranch, and the Palo Corona Regional Park are part of the Holman legacy.

See also
 Timeline of Carmel-by-the-Sea, California
 Hatton Fields

References

External links

 

 A Taste Of History
 Laureles Lodge
 Here's the History of That Old Hatton House

1849 births
1894 deaths
People from County Wicklow
People from Carmel Valley, California
Irish emigrants to the United States (before 1923)
19th-century American businesspeople
Businesspeople in the dairy industry